Zographetus is an Indomalayan  genus of grass skippers in the family Hesperiidae.

Species
Zographetus abima (Hewitson, 1877) Celebes
Zographetus doxus Eliot, 1959 Burma, Thailand, Malaya, Singapore, Borneo
Zographetus dzonguensis Kunte, Karmakar & Lepcha, 2021 (Sikkim) India
Zographetus hainanensis Fang & Wan, 2007 China (Hainan)
Zographetus kutu Eliot, 1959 Selangor
Zographetus ogygia (Hewitson, 1866) Sikkim to Malaya, Thailand, Laos, Borneo, Sumatra, Nias, Banka, Java
Zographetus ogygioides Elwes & Edwards, 1897 Thailand, Malaysia, Borneo, Sumatra
Zographetus pallens de Jong & Treadaway, 1993 Philippines
Zographetus pangi Fan & Wang, 2007 China (Guangdong)
Zographetus rama (Mabille, 1877) Burma, Thailand, Laos, Malaya, Langkawi, Singapore, Sumatra, Philippines, Celebes
Zographetus satwa (de Nicéville, 1884) Sikkim to Burma, Thailand, Laos, Hainan, Malaya, Java

References

External links

Natural History Museum Lepidoptera genus database

Erionotini
Hesperiidae genera